Mel Hurtig  (1932–2016) was a Canadian publisher, author, political activist, and political candidate. He was president of the Edmonton Art Gallery. He described himself as a Canadian nationalist, while he also wrote several books critical of Canadian government policy.

Early life and education
Hurtig was born in Edmonton, Alberta, on 24 June 1932. His parents were Jewish, his father from Romania, and his mother from Russia. An alumnus of the Edmonton Talmud Torah, he grew up in Edmonton and graduated from high school there.

Businessman, publisher and author
In 1956 at the age of 24 he opened a book store, Hurtig Books, on Jasper Avenue and 103rd street which later grew into a large retail book operation with three locations. His stores featured staging of plays, readings of poetry; encouraged social interaction; and unusually, permitted drinking coffee.

After selling his stores in 1972, he established Hurtig Publishers Ltd., with $30,000 in borrowed money. It became "one of the liveliest book publishing companies in Canada." In 1980, he started work on The Canadian Encyclopedia, spending $12 million on a comprehensive three-volume national encyclopedia first published in 1985. A second edition, which took four years to complete and cost $8.5 million to produce, appeared in four volumes in 1988. Much to the surprise of the publisher, the second edition was unexpectedly sold at up to a 55 per cent discount by national companies, roiling the market.

In September 1990, Hurtig published the five-volume Junior Encyclopedia of Canada, the first encyclopedia for young Canadians. He sold the company to McClelland & Stewart in May 1991.

Hurtig was an Officer of the Order of Canada, was granted honorary Doctor of Laws degrees from six Canadian universities, and was the recipient of the Lester B. Pearson Man of the Year Peace Award.

Politics
In 1967 Hurtig became interested in politics when the Liberal Party was looking for a new leader and ended up supporting Pierre Trudeau's bid for Liberal leadership. In 1972 he ran as a Liberal in the federal riding of Edmonton West and finished second to longtime incumbent Marcel Lambert.

In 1973, he left the Liberal party and joined with other nationalists including Walter Gordon, Jack McClelland, and Claude Ryan to establish the Committee for an Independent Canada (CIC) which lobbied against foreign ownership and cultural imperialism. He served as Chair for the first year.

In 1985, Hurtig established the Council of Canadians, another nationalist organization, five years after the demise of the CIC. The primary purpose of this organization was to lobby against a perceived rising tide of support for free trade. He considered his establishment of the Council as the act he was "most proud of." He would leave in 1992 but the council survives to this day, albeit with a mission of social, environmental, and economic justice rather than nationalism.

In 1992, Hurtig was elected leader of the National Party of Canada and led it in the 1993 federal election. He ran in the riding of Edmonton Northwest, but with 4507 votes and 12.8 per cent of the popular vote, finished a distant third to Anne McLellan. It was nonetheless the best showing of the National Party candidates in that election - notably, Hurtig was the only National Party candidate to finish ahead of an incumbent MP.

Electoral record

Death
In 2005, Hurtig moved from Edmonton to Vancouver, British Columbia, in order to be closer to his four daughters. On 3 August 2016 he died there at a hospital, from complications from pneumonia. On the day of his death, one daughter, Leslie Hurtig, read him "newspaper headlines about the launch of the inquiry into murdered and missing women"; he responded, "Bravo", and died that afternoon, surrounded by family. In addition to his daughters, Hurtig was survived by four grandsons.

Recognition
 Canadian Book Publisher of the Year, 1974 and 1981
 Made an Officer of the Order of Canada, (1980)
 Honorary LL.D degrees from York University (1980), Wilfrid Laurier University (1985), University of Lethbridge (1986), University of Alberta (1986), Concordia University (1990), University of British Columbia (1992)
 Eve Orpen Award for Publishing and Literary Excellence, 1985
 Silver Ribbon Award, City of Edmonton, 1985
 Centenary Medal, Royal Society of Canada, 1986
 Alberta Achievement Award, 1986
 Toastmasters International Communications and Leadership Award, 1986
 President's Award, Canadian Booksellers Association, 1986
 Quill Award, Windsor Press Club, 1986
 Speaker of the Year Award, Canadian Speech Communicators Association, 1986
 Corporate Citizen of the Year Award, Community of Business and Professional. Associates of Canada, 1988
 Lester B. Pearson Man of the Year Peace Award 1988
 125th Anniversary of the Confederation of Canada Medal (1992)
 Canadian Version of the Queen Elizabeth II Golden Jubilee Medal (2002)
 Canadian Version of the Queen Elizabeth II Diamond Jubilee Medal (2012)

Selected works
 Nationalism and Continentalism, 5 November 1981 speech at the Empire Club of Canada
 The Betrayal of Canada, 1991
 A New and Better Canada, policy statement for the National Party of Canada
 How to solve Canada's economic mess without raising personal taxes or increasing the debt (National Party of Canada official platform document in 1993 election).
 At Twilight in the Country/Memoirs of a Canadian Nationalist, 1996
 Pay the Rent or Feed the Kids, 2000
 The Vanishing Country, 2002
 Rushing to Armageddon, 2004
 The Truth About Canada, 2008
 The Arrogant Autocrat: Stephen Harper's Takeover of Canada, 2015

References

External links
 Mel Hurtig found outlet for patriotism through The Canadian Encyclopedia Globe and Mail obituary by Ian Bailey, 8 Aug 2016
Mel Hurtig archival fonds is held at the University of Alberta Archives

1932 births
2016 deaths
Canadian book publishers (people)
Canadian political writers
Alberta candidates for Member of Parliament
Officers of the Order of Canada
Jewish Canadian writers
Jewish Canadian politicians
Leaders of political parties in Canada
Writers from Edmonton
Candidates in the 1972 Canadian federal election
National Party of Canada candidates in the 1993 Canadian federal election
Liberal Party of Canada candidates for the Canadian House of Commons
Canadian people of Romanian-Jewish descent
Canadian people of Russian-Jewish descent
Politicians from Edmonton
Canadian nationalists
Canadian encyclopedists